Bhairavi is one of the ten basic thaats of Hindustani music from the Indian subcontinent. It is also the name of a raga within this thaat.

Description
Bhairavi makes use of all the Komal swaras, Rishabh, Gandhar, Dhaivat, Nishad. When singing compositions in Bhairavi raga, the singers however take liberty to use all the 12 swaras. Bhairavi raga is named after the Shakti or feminine aspect of the cosmic life force, which is personified as a consort of Shiva (Bhairava).

Ragas
Ragas in Bhairavi thaat include:

 Bhairavi
 Bilaskhani Todi
 Bhupal Todi
 Kaunsi Kanada
 Komal Rishabh Asavari
 Malkauns

References

Hindustani music theory